Rakhim Ruslanovich Chakhkiev (born 11 January 1983) is a Russian former professional boxer who competed from 2009 to 2016. He held the IBO cruiserweight title in 2015, the European cruiserweight title in 2014, and challenged once for the WBC cruiserweight title in 2013. As an amateur he won a silver medal at the 2007 World Championships and gold at the 2008 Olympics, both in the heavyweight division.

Amateur career
Chakhkiyev beat Jasur Matchanov inside the distance to become 2006 Military world champion at 201 lbs. He also beat Cuban Osmay Acosta 24:15 at the (team) World Cup 2006 but Russia lost.

In 2006 he lost to world class (silver medallist 2005) fellow southpaw Roman Romanchuk at the Russian Championships but defeated him 28-25 in 2007 to win the Russian national title 2007.

At the world championships he defeated among others Elchin Alizade of Azerbaijan 17-6 and John M'Bumba to reach the final where he lost 6:7 against Italian Clemente Russo. In 2008 he lost to Deontay Wilder in a Duals.

Olympic results
2008
Defeated Ali Mazaheri (Iran) 7-3
Defeated John M'Bumba (France) 18-9
Defeated Osmay Acosta (Cuba) 10-5
Defeated Clemente Russo (Italy) 4-2

World Championship results
2007 (as a heavyweight)
Defeated Evan Redd (Aruba) RSCH 2
Defeated John Sweeney (Ireland) 28-5
Defeated Elchin Alizade (Azberbaijan) 17-6
Defeated John M'Bumba (France) 21-9
Lost to Clemente Russo (Italy) 6-7 (won a silver medal)

Professional boxing record

References

External links

1983 births
Living people
Cruiserweight boxers
Heavyweight boxers
Olympic boxers of Russia
Boxers at the 2008 Summer Olympics
Olympic gold medalists for Russia
Ingush people
People from Tobolsk
Olympic medalists in boxing
Medalists at the 2008 Summer Olympics
Russian male boxers
International Boxing Organization champions
AIBA World Boxing Championships medalists
European Boxing Union champions
Sportspeople from Tyumen Oblast